Manang is a district (amphoe) of Satun Province, southern Thailand.

History
The district was created on 15 July 1996 by splitting two tambons from Khuan Kalong District On 15 May 2007, all 81 minor districts were upgraded to full districts. On August 24 the upgrade became official.

Geography
Neighboring districts are (from the north clockwise) Palian of Trang Province, Khuan Kalong, La-ngu and Thung Wa of Satun Province.

Administration
The district is divided into two sub-districts (tambons), which are further subdivided into 18 villages (muban). There are no municipal (thesaban) areas, and two tambon administrative organizations (TAO).

References

External links
amphoe.com
All data about Manang and Palm Phatthana in English
 http://www.satunthailand.com

Districts of Satun province